Live Session! is a live album by jazz saxophonist Cannonball Adderley recorded at Memory Lane, Los Angeles in 1962 and the Lighthouse, Hermosa Beach in 1964 and released on the Capitol label featuring performances by Adderley with Nat Adderley, Joe Zawinul, Sam Jones and Louis Hayes and vocalist Ernie Andrews.

Reception
The Allmusic review by Ronnie D. Lankford Jr. awarded the album 4 stars and states "The material cuts a wide swath across non-jazz genres, from the bluesy "Next Time I See You" to the popular "Since I Fell for You" to the fun nonsense of "Green Door." Although the instrumental work takes a back seat to the vocals, both Cannonball and Nat Adderley find room to offer pithy solos that spice up the proceedings. The accompaniment is an active one, too, with intricate piano and horns highlighting and underlining Andrews as needed". The Penguin Guide to Jazz awarded the album 3 stars stating "Live Session actually comes from gigs two years apart, and were meant to launch the singing voice of Andrews as much as Adderley. He sounds fine but the band takes a back seat to the singer and for Cannonball fans this one's secondary".

Track listing
 Cannonball Adderley's Introduction - 0:28
 "Big City" (Mark Jenkin) - 3:19
 "Next Time I See You" (Earl Forest, William G. Harvey) - 3:53
 "I'm Always Drunk in San Francisco" (Tommy Wolf) - 3:20
 "Ten Years of Tears" (Vicki Harrington) - 2:48
 "Bill Bailey" (Hughie Cannon) - 3:07
 "I'm a Born World Shaker" (Wolf, Fran Landesman, Nelson Algren) - 3:28
 "Don't Be Afraid of Love" (Billy Davis, Berry Gordy, Jr., Harvey Pratt) - 2:52
 "Since I Fell for You" (Buddy Johnson) - 2:13
 "If You Never Fall in Love With Me" (Jones, Donald Wolf) - 2:55
 "Come On Back" (Eddie Beal, Hal Levy, Len Wyatt) - 4:18 Bonus track on CD
 "Work Song" (Nat Adderley, Oscar Brown Jr.) - 4:48 Bonus track on CD
 "Green Door" (Marvin Moore, Bob Davie) - 4:58 Bonus track on CD  
Recorded live on September 19, 1962 (tracks 3, 5, 7 & 9-11) and October 4, 1964 (tracks 2, 4, 6, 8, 12 & 13)

Personnel
Cannonball Adderley - alto saxophone
Ernie Andrews - vocals
Nat Adderley - cornet
Joe Zawinul - piano
Sam Jones - bass
Louis Hayes - drums

Production
Original sessions produced by David Axelrod and Cannonball Adderley
Reissue produced by Michael Cuscuna
Wally Heider (1962 recording) and Bill Smith (1964 recording) - recording engineer
Remastered in 24 bit by Ron McMaster
Original cover art - Cliff Condak
Reissue design - Patrick Roques

References

1964 live albums
Capitol Records live albums
Cannonball Adderley live albums
Albums produced by David Axelrod (musician)
Albums produced by Cannonball Adderley
Albums produced by Michael Cuscuna